Hrib pri Cerovcu is a small settlement in the Municipality of Semič in Slovenia. It lies just north of Cerovec pri Črešnjevcu. The area is part of the historical region of Lower Carniola. The municipality is now included in the Southeast Slovenia Statistical Region.

References

External links
Hrib pri Cerovcu at Geopedia

Populated places in the Municipality of Semič